Santiago Brouard or Santi Brouard (1919 in Lekeitio – 20 November 1984 in  Bilbao) was a doctor and Basque politician. He was one of the leaders of Herri Batasuna, and deputy mayor of Bilbao. He was killed by the Spanish government's death squad, the Grupos Antiterroristas de Liberación (GAL), in one of its highest-profile acts. Broaurd was shot by GAL gunmen Luis Morcillo and Rafael López Ocaña as he left his paediatric clinic in Bilbao.

Early years
Born in the town of Lekeitio, he studied medicine in the university of Valladolid. After finishing his studies, he went back to the Basque Country and specialized in paediatrics in Basurtu hospital. He married Teresa Aldamiz, with whom he had three children. He helped create the first ikastolas (schools where lessons were given in Basque language) in Bizkaia.

Joining politics
In 1974, Brouard had to escape to the Northern Basque Country (French side of the Basque Country) after he treated an ETA member who had been shot by the Spanish police. There he met leading ETA members, such as Argala. He took part in the creation of the KAS alternatiba when Franco's regime was about to end. Brouard was one of the creators of EHAS, the group that after 1977 would be known as HASI. Brouard was named president of HASI and when Herri Batasuna was created, he became a member of that party. He always saw himself as Basque nationalist and socialist.

When he returned from exile, he resumed work as a doctor and remained active in politics. He was sent to prison in 1983 together with other Herri Batasuna members accused of singing the Basque fighters' song Eusko Gudariak when the Spanish King Juan Carlos I went to Gernika. They interrupted his speech and all members who were singing had to be led out of the building, amid protests. He became a member of the National Executive of Herri Batasuna, and later became a deputy in the Spanish parliament in Madrid. At the same time, he was a deputy mayor of Bilbao.

Death
Santi Brouard had been warned that right-wing Spanish paramilitary groups had targeted him, but he said he would not flee and that he would not lock his office door because of it. On 20 November 1984 Luis Morcillo and Rafael López Ocaña shot him dead at his workplace. The day on which they killed Brouard was the anniversary of the deaths of both José Antonio Primo de Rivera and Francisco Franco.

The police investigation identified and accused Morcillo and López Ocaña of killing Brouard, but a judge in the Audiencia Nacional of Spain released them from prison in 1999. In 2013, Morcillo stated that the killing was ordered by Guardia Civil commander Rafael Masa, probably at the instigation of Julián Sancristóbal, then a State Security official. The killers were paid 7.5 m pesetas by the Ministry of the Interior.

Recognitions
 The mayor of Bilbao named a street after Brouard in the neighbourhood of Ametzola.
 The mayor of Lekeitio named the public sportsfield of the town after him.

See also
 GAL

References

External links
 Santi Brouard. Euskal Herria osagai. Duingastuna omen Documentary made by the popular movement 'Euskal Herria osagai' in Lekeitio.
  With Santi Brouard after Hasi's congress Interview in the magazine Argia (1982)
 25 years remembering Santi Brouard in Andalucia Article in the webpage Kaos en la Red
 El asesinato de Santiago Brouard Special webpage by El Mundo about GAL
 Rafael López Ocaña admits having killed Santi Brouard Piece of news in the webpage of Torturaren Kontrako Taldea (Group Against Torture)
 Santiago Brouard Jauna Article in the magazine Argia (1999)

1919 births
1984 deaths
Assassinated Spanish politicians
Basque conflict
Basque nationalism
Herri Batasuna politicians
People from Lea-Artibai
University of Valladolid alumni
Spanish physicians